Richard Brent Tully (born March 9, 1943) is a Canadian-born American astronomer at the Institute for Astronomy in Honolulu, Hawaii.

Born in Toronto, Ontario, and raised in Vancouver, British Columbia, Tully's specialty is the astrophysics of galaxies. With J. Richard Fisher, he proposed the Tully–Fisher relation, which shows that the luminosity of a galaxy and the orbital velocities of its stars are correlated.  This relation can be used to determine the distances of galaxies and, by inference, the size and age of the universe. His books The Nearby Galaxies Atlas & Catalog published in 1988 give the 3D locations for 2,400 galaxies within 130 million light years of Earth. A particularly remarkable discovery was that our Milky Way galaxy lies adjacent a vast underdense region that Tully called the Local Void.  A more extended compilation of 30,000 galaxies within a cube of diameter 700 million light years centered on Earth can be visually navigated with the planetarium computer software Starry Night Pro, where the data is called the Tully Database.

Tully, along with colleagues Helene Courtois, Daniel Pomarede, and Yehuda Hoffman, have compiled and analyzed galaxy distances and deviations of galaxy motions from cosmic expansion within the Cosmicflows program. Noteworthy discoveries have been the full extent of our home supercluster of galaxies, given the name  Laniakea Supercluster, and of the adjacent, very large  South Pole Wall  of galaxies.  Cumulatively, the large scale structure in the distribution of matter in a volume of diameter 1.3 billion light years centered on our location mapped by Tully and his colleagues reasonably accounts for the motion of our  Local Group  of galaxies of over 600 kilometers/second although there remains the possibility of influences from even larger scales.

Brent Tully received numerous awards and recognitions, among which the Viktor Ambartsumian Prize and the Gruber Prize in Cosmology, both in 2014.

See also
 Large-scale structure of the cosmos

References

External links
R. Brent Tully Personal Homepage

1943 births
Living people
Canadian astronomers
People from Toronto
People from Vancouver